The Australian Antarctic Territory, claimed by Australia on 1 December 1959, has used a postal system as its main point of contact since its establishment, due to its isolation. The territory covers over 5.8 million kilometres squared and currently has 5 stations, after Wilkes Station closed down in 1969. Each of the bases has their own post office that are run by Australia Post, who also controls stamp issues according to recent or important events within the territory. The history of the postage system dates back to the original post office within the territory, which first opened in 1955, which was in conjunction with a stamp release. The current system now combines new technologies with aged systems to create more efficiency, with recent stamp releases commending the history of the Australian Antarctic Territory and the Arts.

History 

Australia has issued postage stamps for the Australian Antarctic Territory since 1957. All have been Antarctic themed, and are also valid for postage in Australia, so in practice, they are just Australian stamps with a different inscription. The Australian Antarctic Territory Act (1954) allowed for a postage system to be introduced in 1955, under the commonwealth and after the territory had commenced philatelic colonialism. The introduction of the system produced both a postmark and postcard, which could be used both on mainland Australia (for postage all over the country, not specifically to the Antarctic Territory) or from the Territory itself.

Post

Past postage systems 
Before the Australian Antarctic Territory Act was signed in 1954, all expeditions to Antarctica were customised with different rubber postage stamps, due to the adhesive postage stamp being not yet used amongst society. For the Australian Antarctic Expedition, 1911–14, commandeered and under the leadership of Sir Douglas Mawson a stamp was commissioned in order to show that letters were being sent from the ship used to travel to Antarctica. The stamps were round, with an emperor penguin and the inscription “LOOSE SHIP’S LETTER/POSTED IN ANTARCTICA/S.Y. AURORA”. All letters leaving from the S.Y. Aurora were stamped with an Australian stamp, which was then covered with the official expedition stamp in order to show the location from which they were sent from.

This system was adjusted in 1955 when the first post office was established in MacRobertson Land (Mawson Station), where letters were stamped with adhesive stamps and sent via plane or ship to mainland Australia, where they were sorted and distributed across the country.

However, when expeditions were organised, such as the South Indian Ocean Expedition to Heard Island (1964–65) and the Australian National Antarctic Research Expeditions (1947–65), rubber stamps were also commissioned, often featuring penguins, in order to clearly identify where letters were arriving from in the sorting office in mainland Australia.

Australian Antarctic Territory postage stamps 
In the past, until approximately 1970, stamps were issued in both Australia and the Australian Antarctic Territory, and were available in Australian post offices for two weeks before being “procurable at the [Australia Post] Department’s philatelic sections in all States”, in order to increase interest around the Antarctic discoveries for Australia. However, after this period, stamps for the Territory were issued in both Australia and the Australian Antarctic Territory, yet limited in Australia to a small amount of stock which could be bought at Australia Post Offices. Throughout both periods, all stamps were still valid after their sale in both Australia and the Australian Antarctic Territory.

Past stamp designs 

Antarctic Research Commemorative Stamp: (Australian release only)

On the 17th of November 1954, prior to the commencement of the postage system in the Australian Antarctic Territory, a stamp to commemorate the discoveries made and expeditions by

Australians within the Territory was issued throughout mainland Australia. As pictured, it featured several important flora and fauna relevant to certain discoveries, including;

 Black-bowed Albatross (Domeda Melanorphris) (Temminck)
 Kerguelen Cabbage (Pringlea antiscorbutica)
 King Penguin (Aptenodytes patagonica)  
 2 fish breeds; (Cygnodraco mawasoni) and (Notothenia macrocephala)
 Elephant Seal (Miroungra leonine) (Linn)
 Crustaceans (Zooplankton)
 Gentoo Penguin (Pygoscelia papua (Forster)
 Coastal bog plant (Pleurophylum hookeri (Buch))

First stamp

The first stamp issued specifically for the territory was a two-shilling blue stamp with a design of explorers and an Antarctic map. This was first issued in Australia on 27 March 1957 and in Antarctica on 11 December 1957. The original stamp design of 1957, which included a map of Antarctica, was seen as an “aggressive geopolitical assertion of territory” by the Australians, due to the map clearly marking the territory's boundaries.  This caused issues within Antarctica as a whole, as the “issuing of postmarks can only be performed by a sovereign state”. However, more than 23,000 letters were stamped with this postmark up until 1909, when several more stamps, such as the ‘Explorers at South Magnetic Pole’ and ‘Dog Sled and Team’ were released.

This stamp also features the flying of the Australian flag, in Vestfold Hills, Antarctica, on 3 March 1954, after a temporary landing in the Antarctic by Peter Shaw, Philip Law, and Dr. Arthur Gwynn. The flag flying image was converted to a drawing from a photograph donated by ANARE (Australian National Antarctic Research Expeditions), showing the three scientists next to the flag waving in the wind. This first stamp was sold at only two shillings per print.

The first commemorative stamp 
The first commemorative stamp (as seen in the infobox) of the Australian Antarctic Territory was released on the 16th of October, 1961 to commemorate the 50th anniversary of the first Antarctic Expedition in 1911, led by the Australian scientist and explorer, Sir Douglas Mawson. This stamp features an image of Mawson on this expedition, surrounded by the words ‘Australian Antarctic Territory’. On the day of release for this stamp, Lady Francisca Adriana Mawson, the widowed wife of Mawson, received a “special album on behalf of the Postmaster General, Hon. C. W. Davidson”. The album contained a sheet of the minted stamps of Mawson, as well as past Australian Antarctic Territory that had also depicted him, such as ‘Explorers at South Magnetic Pole’ (1959). Similarly, an “imperforate block of four of the Mawson stamps was presented to Sir Thomas Playford, Premier of South Australia, for inclusion in the collection of the National Gallery of South Australia”.

Current postage system 
Mail is delivered according to the transport schedule of the Australian Antarctic Territory from Hobart International Airport, Tasmania. All mail is consolidated at the Territory's Australian headquarters in Hobart, then consigned to transport, according to the schedule. There are several regulations around the postal system, in order to ensure that it runs smoothly due to the limited movement between the Territory and mainland Australia. Some of these include that all mail over one kilogram is considered to be cargo, whilst mail under one kilogram is considered air mail. All cargo mail leaves Tasmania with cargo flights, rather than on regular transportation flights.

Recent stamp designs

2021

March 2021
The stamp issue of 6 March 2021 showed printed images of contributors to the Australian Antarctic Territory Arts Fellowship programme. There is one stamp design for music, painting, photography and sound recording, to "create opportunities for artists to work with art, science and technology partners”, as well as use the Australian Antarctic Territory to gain inspiration for their artistic works.

Artists featured on the Australian Antarctic Territory Fellowship Stamps

 Alice Giles AM:
Giles is featured on the ‘Music’ stamp, capturing her performance on the Harp at centenary of the first Australian Antarctic Expedition.
 Associate Professor Philip Samartzis: (RMIT University, Melbourne)

Samartzis is portrayed on the ‘Sound Recording’ stamp, to capture the ‘experience of working in a unique research station’, and ‘explore the impacts of extreme environmental conditions on people’.

 David Neilson:

Neilson's images from 1990 to 1991 and 2004 to 2005 are featured on the ‘Photography’ stamp, portraying the “great white south”

 John Kelly:

The painter and sculptor appears with his highlights of his work; a series of 57 oil paintings from 2013 on the ‘Painting’ stamp.

October 2021
This issue, released on 5 October 2021, features four different kinds of Lichen endemic to the AAT. 

They are:
 Buellia frigida
 Xanthoria mawsonii
 Umbilicaria decussata
 Xanthoria elegans

Stamp issues

Pre-decimal stamps

Decimal stamps

Used stamps 
Used stamps from the territory are usually found with either mainland Australia postal cancels, or first-day cover cancels as there is relatively little genuine mail from the bases.

Bases
The Australian Antarctic Territory bases are:
 Casey Station
 Davis Station 
 Macquarie Island Station
 Mawson Station 
 Heard Island 
Cape Denison (Opened 2010)
 Wilkes Station (now closed)
Base cover sets are issued from Mawson, Davis, Casey and Macquarie Island stations. 

All AAT mail will be cancelled with a postmark from one of these bases, though First Day Covers are now thought to be cancelled with the relevant base name at the Australian Philatelic Bureau, and not all bases are currently in use or permanently occupied.

References

Further reading
 Milner, Roy M. Postal History of the Australian Antarctic 1911–1965. London: Published for the Polar Postal History Society of Great Britain by Robson Lowe Ltd., 1975 , 48p.
 Woolley, Colleen A. and Janet S. Eury. Postmarks of the Australian Antarctic Territory 1911–2004. Diamond Creek, Vic, Australia: Australian PictorMarks, 2004 , 97p.

External links

 Official website
 Enjoy polar philately on a cold winter's evening by Janet Klug
 Sandafayre Stamp Atlas – Antarctica

Australian Antarctic Territory
Australian Antarctic Territory
Philately of Australia
Postal history of Australia
Postage stamps of Australia